Ramisco is a red Portuguese wine grape variety that is planted primarily in the Colares DOC. As a varietal, Ramisco produces very tannic and astringent wines.

Synonyms
There are three synonyms of Ramisco: Ramisco de Colares, Rasmisco nos Açores and Ramisco Tinto.

See also
List of Portuguese grape varieties

References

Red wine grape varieties